was a town located in Miyaki District, Saga Prefecture, Japan. The status of this municipality was changed from a village to a town on April 1, 1965.

As of 2003, the town had an estimated population of 11,419 and a density of 687.06 persons per km2. The total area was 16.62 km2.

On March 1, 2005, Kitashigeyasu, along with the towns of Mine and Nakabaru (all from Miyaki District), was merged to create the town of Miyaki.

Dissolved municipalities of Saga Prefecture